Henderson William Luelling (April 23, 1809 – December 28, 1878) was an American horticulturist, Quaker, abolitionist and early Oakland, California settler. He introduced varietal fruits to the Pacific coast, first to Oregon and later to California, and gave the Fruitvale district its name. In his later years, he led a Utopian community from California to Honduras, only to encounter overwhelming adversity, which sent him back to California.

Early life: horticulture and abolitionism 
Luelling was born on April 23, 1809, in Randolph County, North Carolina, where he lived until at least 1822.

Luelling and his brother John went into the nursery business together in Henry County, Indiana in 1835. Soon after, Henderson became interested in Oregon, upon reading the journals of Lewis and Clark. Henderson moved to Salem, Iowa in 1837, purchasing land for a nursery jointly with John. John disposed of the Indiana property and joined Henderson in 1841. They also established a dry goods store.

In the early 1840s, Luelling and his wife, Jane Elizabeth Presnall Luelling, built a two-story residence with features for hiding former slaves on the Underground Railroad. They were ousted from the Salem Monthly Meeting of Friends, for their abolitionist activities.

The first orchards on the west coast 
Luelling and his family (including eight children) departed for Oregon in 1847. They brought a wagonload of 700 fruit trees, half of which survived the journey. He coordinated with William Meek, a fellow Iowa nurseryman. They selected a variety of fruits that would ripen from summer through winter. Meek also brought trees to Oregon, where the two reconvened and established a nursery where Milwaukie would soon be established. Luelling's brother Seth also joined them the following year, and though he also established himself in the fruit tree business, he did not partner with them. It is likely that Seth bought the nursery in about 1859.

Luelling sold trees for 1 to 1.50 each. Ultimately, the nursery supplied orchards for the settlers who came to Oregon following the passage of the Donation Land Claim Act in 1850.

The Luelling brothers' horticultural accomplishments have been described as the source of much of Milwaukie's early fame. The site of their first nursery in Milwaukie is now the Waverley Country Club.

Henderson left for the San Francisco Bay Area in 1854, with his son Alfred and son-in-law William Meek. Seth, and later Alfred, continued the Milwaukie nursery for many years, and it became a hub for populist and progressive political organization decades later.

Henderson bought 50 acres at the southern end of Alameda County, but after a title dispute, bought 400 acres on Sausal Creek in what is now Oakland. The orchard he established was called Fruit Vale, the namesake of the present neighborhood of Fruitvale.

The contributions of Luelling and Meek were acknowledged in Frances Fuller Victor's History of Oregon, vol. 1.

Utopian ambitions 
Luelling outlived each of his first three wives. His fourth, he abandoned in California when he sold his orchard and business and left for Honduras in 1858, hoping to establish a utopian community called the Harmonial Brotherhood. The venture was a failure, and he returned to California two years later. He died in 1878, and was buried in Mountain View Cemetery.

Surname 
In many records his family name is spelled Lewelling, and his brother Seth used that spelling. According to Henderson's son Alfred, the spelling had been changed from the original Welsh spelling by Henderson and Seth's father, prior to Henderson's birth; but Seth reverted to the original spelling later in life. Similarly, some records list his birth year as 1809 or 1810, and his death year as 1878 or 1879.

Television depiction
The actor Royal Dano was cast as Luelling in the 1965 episode, "The Traveling Trees," on the syndicated television series,  Death Valley Days, hosted by Ronald Reagan. In the story line, Luelling, against the advice of his wagon master, takes the Hastings Cutoff to Oregon, where he intends to plant an apple orchard. Tim McIntire appeared as a young reformed outlaw, Ben Fraser, with Robert Yuro as Ben's older brother, Spencer Fraser.

See also 
 Henderson Lewelling House
 Joseph Hamilton Lambert

References
  Content in this article was copied from Henderson Luelling at the Oakland Wiki, which is available under the Creative Commons Attribution 4.0 International (CC BY 4.0) license.

Further reading
 

1809 births
1878 deaths
American horticulturists
American orchardists
People from Oregon
People from Oakland, California
People from Randolph County, North Carolina
American Quakers
American abolitionists